Xylosma tuberculata is a species of flowering plant in the family Salicaceae. It is endemic to New Caledonia.

References

Endemic flora of New Caledonia
tuberculata
Vulnerable plants
Taxa named by Hermann Otto Sleumer
Taxonomy articles created by Polbot